Beldaur Assembly constituency is an assembly constituency in Khagaria district in the Indian state of Bihar.

Overview
As per Delimitation of Parliamentary and Assembly constituencies Order, 2008, No. 150 Beldaur Assembly constituency is composed of the following: Beldaur and Chautham community development blocks; Banni, Jhiktiya, Samaspur, Maheshkhunt, Pakrail, Maira, Baltara, Pawra, Koela and Borna gram panchayats of Gogri CD Block.

Beldaur  Assembly constituency is part of No. 25 Khagaria (Lok Sabha constituency).

Member of Legislative Assembly

Election results

2020

2015

References

External links
 

Assembly constituencies of Bihar
Politics of Khagaria district